NGC 6778 is a planetary nebula (PNe) located about 10,300 light years away from the Sun in the equatorial constellation of Aquila. It is positioned 5° to the SSW of the prominent star Delta Aquilae. This nebula was discovered by German astronomer Albert Marth during the period 1863–1865. English astronomer John Herschel may have mistakenly catalogued it as NGC 6785, as nothing can be found now at those coordinates. In the New General Catalogue it was described as a "small, elongated, ill-defined disk".

This PNe displays a disrupted morphology, with a roughly S-shaped feature projecting out of an irregular shell, along with linear jet-like forms. The inner part contains a highly distorted elliptical ring oriented along an east-west direction.

At the center of the nebula is a close binary star system with an orbital period of just 3.68 hours, one of the shortest known among the binary central stars that form a planetary nebulae. Their proximity to each other provides strong evidence that they have passed through a common-envelope (CE) phase earlier in their evolution.

The surrounding nebula is inclined about 85° to the line of sight from the Earth. The torus of this nebula is notable for its high expansion velocity, measured at up to 60–70 km/s. It displays collimated outflows, possibly as a result of the CE behavior of the central stars or else a short-lived accretion disk. The pair of jets are located along a position angle of 15°, showing fast outflow with radial velocities of around 100 km/s. The nebula is notable for the rich amount of filamentary "low-ionization structures", or LIS, resembling the wispy structures of nova explosions. These too may be the result of the CE interaction.

In addition to a higher than normal helium abundance, the nebula displays unusually strong optical recombination lines from heavier elements; one of the highest known among PNe. These may be the result of a very late thermal pulse, or "final flash", following the initial ejection of the stellar envelope that formed the nebula. The pulse would have ejected chemically-enriched material into the old nebula, changing its abundances.

References

External links 
 

Planetary nebulae
Binary stars
Aquila (constellation)
6778